Velika Strmica is a small settlement in the Municipality of Mokronog-Trebelno in southeastern Slovenia. The area is part of the historical region of Lower Carniola. The municipality is now included in the Southeast Slovenia Statistical Region. 

A hill fort dating to Late Antiquity has been identified near the settlement. It was built in a strategic position above the important Roman road from Emona to Siscia.

References

External links
Velika Strmica on Geopedia

Populated places in the Municipality of Mokronog-Trebelno